The Manhasset–Lakeville Water District (MLVWD) is a public water utility district serving a large portion of Nassau County, on Long Island, in New York, United States.

History 
The Manhasset–Lakeville Water District was founded in 1911, thus making it one of the oldest public water suppliers on all of Long Island.

In 1958, voters in the district voted against a controversial proposal to add fluoride to the district's water supply.

In the 2010s, the MLVWD replaced the Munsey Park Water Tower with a newer, more efficient one.

Communities served 
The Manhasset–Lakeville Water District serves the following communities:

 Flower Hill (part, with the Port Washington Water District and the Roslyn Water District)
 Great Neck Plaza (part, with the Water Authority of Great Neck North)
 Lake Success
 Manhasset
 Manhasset Hills (part, with the Garden City Park Water District)
 Munsey Park
 North Hills (part, with the Garden City Park Water District, the Roslyn Water District, and the Western Nassau Water Authority)
 North New Hyde Park (part, with the Garden City Park Water District and the Western Nassau Water Authority)
 Plandome Heights
 Plandome Manor (part, with the Port Washington Water District)
 Russell Gardens
 Strathmore
 Thomaston (part, with the Water Authority of Great Neck North)
 University Gardens

Gap in service 
The Village of Plandome is not served by the district, as the village maintains its own water system. This makes the Plandome Manor portion of the MLVWD separated from the rest of the district's system.

Statistics 

 Average annual amount of water pumped: approximately 2.49 billion gallons
 Number of wells: 18
 Number of above-ground tanks: 6
 Number of below-ground tanks: 2
 Number of treatment plants: 2
 Largest customer: North Shore University Hospital

Interconnections 
The MLVWD has 6 interconnections with neighboring water districts. These interconnections are with the Albertson Water District, the Garden City Park Water District, the Port Washington Water District, the Water Authority of Great Neck North, and the Western Nassau Water Authority.

References

External links 

 Official website

Manhasset, New York
Water supply infrastructure in the United States